Stone of Destiny may refer to:

Monuments 
 Stone of Scone, the coronation stone of Scottish monarchs
 Lia Fáil (Stone of Destiny), a monolithic stone in Ireland
  (Stone of Destiny), stone that Goídel Glas chose as his seat in Hispania

Media 
 Stone of Destiny (film), a 2008 film directed by Charles Martin Smith
Stone of Destiny (book), 1940 book by Ion Idriess
 Stone of Destiny, a 2002 Irish reel by Maurice Lennon of Stockton's Wing